Glück (transliterated Glueck) is the surname of:
 Alois Glück (born 1940), German politician
 Bernard Glueck (disambiguation), several people with this name
 Christian Friedrich von Glück (1755–1831), German jurist
 Eleanor Glueck (1898–1972), American criminologist and wife of Sheldon Glueck
 George Glueck (born 1950), German music producer and artist manager
 Gustav Glück (1871–1952), Austrian art historian
 Helen Iglauer Glueck (1907–1995), American physician
 Johann Ernst Glück (1652–1705), German translator and Lutheran theologian
 Larry Glueck (born 1941), American football (NFL) defensive back
 Louise Glück (born 1943), American poet
 Nelson Glueck (1900–1971), American rabbi, academic and archaeologist
 Sheldon Glueck (1896–1980), Polish American criminologist
 Wolfgang Glück (born 1929), Austrian film director and screenwriter

See also 
 Glack
 Glick
 Richard Glücks (1889–1945), a German Nazi official and Holocaust perpetrator
 Andrej Glucks (born 1976), Croatian slalom canoer
 Glock
 Gluek (disambiguation)
 Gluck (surname)

German-language surnames
Jewish surnames